Felicia Marie Knaul (born April 24, 1966) is a British–Canadian health economist who is director of the University of Miami Institute for Advanced Study of the Americas and a professor at the Leonard M. Miller School of Medicine. She is an economist with the Mexican Health Foundation and president of the non-governmental organization Tómatelo a Pecho, an advocacy organisation that promote women's health in Latin America. Her research and leadership has focused around raising awareness of breast cancer in low and middle income countries.

Early life and education 
Knaul was born and raised in Toronto. Her father is a Holocaust survivor, whose family had been murdered by the Nazis. She said that "the mute cry of the Holocaust was tattooed on my father's forearm,". In 1984, Knaul's father died from stomach cancer. This experience motivated her to improve people's access to healthcare. Knaul was an undergraduate student in the University of Toronto where she studied international development. During her early career, she worked with street children in Guatemala. She moved to the United States for graduate studies, specialising in economics at Harvard University in the research group of Amartya Sen. Her doctoral research considered the impact of education on young people's earning. She conducted research in Bogotá.

Research and career 
Whilst completing her doctoral research, Knaul was appointed by the Colombian government to reform the Columbian Health System. She moved to Mexico, where she joined the Mexican Health Foundation and worked with her husband Julio Frenk, then Minister of Health, to establish the Seguro Popular. Seguro Popular was a social insurance system that provided Mexican people with access to health services. In partnership with Frenk, Knaul created school systems in hospitals to educate young people in long-term treatment. This received the Global Development Network Prize for Outstanding Research on Change. Knaul has focused on tackling aspects of healthcare which have historically been overlooked, including transforming access to palliative care and improving access to cancer screening.

Knoll served as chair of The Lancet commission on improving access to palliative care. It revealed that people in low and middle income countries often struggle to access palliative care, and that millions of adults and children die in considerable pain. She estimated that providing pain relief to suffering children would cost $1 million a year. She also highlighted that 90% of the morphine in the world is consumed by the world's richest 10% of people.

After her own experiences of breast cancer, Knaul focused on tackling disparities in access to cancer screening in Mexico. She established a non-profit focused on improving women's awareness of the risks associated with breast cancer in 2007. The organisation, Cáncer de Mama: Tómatelo a Pecho's name derives from a Mexican saying (“take it to breast,”), which makes to take it seriously. She was appointed to the Lancet Commission on Women and Health in 2012, and argued that improving the health of girls and women is critical for sustainable development. In 2013, Knaul described her experiences in the book Beauty without the Breast.

In 2009, Knaul joined the faculty at the Harvard Global Equity Initiative, which was chaired by Amartya Sen. She worked to expand access to cancer care around the world, launching the Global Task Force on Expanded Access to Cancer Care. Within months of arriving, she coordinated an international conference on breast cancer care in low and middle income countries.

Knaul was appointed director of the Miami Institute for the Advanced Study of the Americas in 2016, where she worked to guide palliative care in Mexico.

Awards and honours 
 2015 Global Health Catalyst Award
 2016 American Medical Women's Association Local Hero
 2017 Fairchild Tropical Botanic Garden Philanthropy Award
 2020 Autonomous University of Nuevo León Flama, Vida y Mujer
 2020 Elected Fellow of the Canadian Academy of Health Sciences

Selected publications

Personal life 
Knaul was diagnosed with stage II breast cancer in 2007. She underwent surgery in Mexico City, and, after a full mastectomy, had fifteen months of chemotherapy. She was treated with Trastuzumab and Tamoxifen.

Knaul is married to Julio Frenk, with whom she has two daughters.

References 

Harvard University alumni
University of Toronto alumni
University of Miami faculty
1966 births
Living people
Health economists